Titus Vibius Varus was a Roman senator, who was active during the reign of Trajan. He was suffect consul in the nundinium of September to December 115 as the colleague of Marcus Pompeius Macrinus Neos Theophanes. He is known entirely from inscriptions.

Bernard Remy suggests that his family came from Brixia in Istria, or Region X of Italy. Remy also identifies Varus as the father of Titus Vibius Varus, ordinary consul in 134. Besides the consulate, Varus is known to have held one office, governor of the public province of Creta et Cyrenaica during the reign of Trajan.

References 

1st-century Romans
2nd-century Romans
Suffect consuls of Imperial Rome
Roman governors of Crete and Cyrenaica
Varus, Titus